The basketball qualification for the Summer Olympics men's basketball tournament occurred from 2014 to 2016; all five FIBA (International Basketball Federation) zones sent in teams.

The first qualifying tournament was the 2014 FIBA Basketball World Cup in which the champion was guaranteed of a place in the Olympics. Throughout the next two years, several regional tournaments served as qualification for the zonal tournaments, which doubled as intercontinental championships, to determine which teams would participate in the 2016 Rio de Janeiro Summer Olympics.

Method

Qualification via continental championships and World Cup
A total of 12 teams will take part in the Olympics, with each NOC sending in one team.

There were a total of 5 zonal tournaments (doubling as intercontinental championships) that determined the qualifying teams, with a total of 7 teams qualifying outright. Each zone was allocated with the following qualifying berths:
FIBA Africa: 1 team (Champion)
FIBA Americas: 2 teams (Champion and runner-up)
FIBA Asia: 1 team (Champion)
FIBA Europe: 2 teams (Champion and runner-up)
FIBA Oceania: 1 team (Champion)

Furthermore, the current world champion, the United States qualified automatically by winning at the 2014 FIBA Basketball World Cup.

Qualification via hosting the Olympics
The host nation qualified after FIBA voted to allow them to qualify as hosts in a meeting at Tokyo in August 2015.

Qualification via the wild card tournament
The additional three teams will be determined at the 2016 FIBA World Olympic Qualifying Tournament for Men, with the best non-qualifying teams participating from teams that did not qualify outright. Each zone was allocated with the following berths:

Hosts: 3 teams
FIBA Africa: 3 teams
FIBA Americas: 3 teams
FIBA Asia: 3 teams
FIBA Europe: 5 teams
FIBA Oceania: 1 team

There would be three tournaments, with the winners in each tournament winning a berth to the Olympics. All teams that are participating in the continental championships are allowed to bid as hosts. If the host team already qualified outright, the next best team from its continent would be invited to participate instead of them.

Qualified teams
Teams are arranged by time of qualification.

2014 FIBA Basketball World Cup

As winners of the 2014 FIBA Basketball World Cup, the USA automatically qualified for the 2016 Olympics, and chose not to participate in the 2015 FIBA Americas Championship.

FIBA Africa

AfroBasket qualification
Hosts Tunisia and defending champions Angola qualified automatically. The other berths were disputed per each FIBA Africa zone, with three wild card berths awarded to complete the 16-team roster.

Zone 1

Zone 2

Group B

Group C

Zone 3

Group D

Group E

Zone 4

Group F

Group G

Zone 5

Zone 6

Group I

Group J

AfroBasket

FIBA Americas

FIBA Americas Championship qualification
Qualification in the FIBA Americas was first via the Central American and Caribbean championships, where the top three teams in each tournament advance to the Centrobasket, where four FiBA Americas Championship berths were up for grabs. Four berths were disputed in the South American Championship. Mexico, which had already qualified, were awarded hosting duties. Canada and the USA are automatic entrants, but world champions USA chose to skip the tournament as they had already qualified via the World Cup.

Central America

Caribbean

Central America and Caribbean

South America

FIBA Americas Championship

FIBA Asia

FIBA Asia Championship qualification
Qualification in FIBA Asia was done in two stages. First, on the FIBA Asia Cup, the winner qualifies to the FIBA Asia Championship, while the second to fifth-ranked team get additional berths for their respective FIBA Asia subzones. The second stage was via the subzones. The East Asia subzone chose to award its berths based on the FIBA World Rankings, as no country was willing to host the championship.

FIBA Asia Cup

Central Asia

East Asia

Persian Gulf

South Asia

Southeast Asia

West Asia

FIBA Asia Championship

FIBA Europe

EuroBasket qualification
There were two rounds of qualification for EuroBasket. On the first round, the group winners qualify to a knockout stage; the winner qualifies to the championship, all other teams, including those eliminated in the group stages, participate in the second round, where the group winners and the runners-up, except for the team with worst record, qualifies to the final tournament. European teams that participated in the 2014 FIBA Basketball World Cup also Qualify to the final tournament. Hosts Ukraine were stripped of the hosting duties, but still were retained by virtue of participating in the 2014 FIBA Basketball World Cup; instead hosting rights were awarded to four countries: Croatia, France, Germany and Latvia, each hosting a preliminary round group, with France hosting the final round.

First round

Group A

Group B

Group C

Group D

Knockout stage

Second round

Group A

Group B

Group C

Group D

Group E

Group F

Group G

EuroBasket

FIBA Oceania

FIBA Oceania Championship

FIBA World Olympic Qualifying Tournaments

Draw
In 2016 three qualifying tournaments, each producing a team which qualified for the 2016 Summer Olympics. They were held on 4–10 July 2016 in Turin, Manila and Belgrade. Serbia, Croatia and France qualified for the Olympics as a result of these tournaments.

The format consisted of 18 national teams divided into three tournaments of six teams each, with the winning team from each event qualifying for the Olympics.
The draw for the Olympic qualifiers took place at The House of Basketball in Mies, Switzerland on 26 January 2016. The teams were divided into six pots. The draw had three parts. The first part determined in which of the three qualifying tournaments would each team participate, except for the host countries. The second part determined the grouping of each team (Group A or Group B) and the third part determined their position from 1 to 3, which would be used to determine the fixtures.

The teams' FIBA World Rankings on the day of the draw are shown in brackets.

Turin

Manila

Belgrade

References

 
Basketball at the 2016 Summer Olympics – Men's tournament
basketball
Basketball at the Summer Olympics – Men's qualification